Al Rekayya (also spelled Irkhaya) is an agricultural district in Qatar, located in the municipality of Al Rayyan. It is close to the border with Al Wakrah Municipality.

Hassad Food owns a 162-hectare farm in Al Rekayya. As of 2012, the Qatari Arab Dairy Company (Ghadeer) owned and operated the largest farm in Qatar out of Al Rekayya. The farm spanned 1,200 hectares, had an inventory of roughly 2,400 cattle and primarily grew forage crops such as alfalfa and clover.

Etymology
The district's name translates to "well". As an agricultural area located in a rawda (depression), the local well historically played an important role in its inhabitant's lives.

Gallery

References

Populated places in Al Rayyan